Vitellariopsis dispar is a species of plant in the family Sapotaceae. It is found in South Africa and Eswatini.

References

dispar
Least concern plants
Taxonomy articles created by Polbot
Taxa named by N. E. Brown
Taxa named by André Aubréville